César Augusto Peñaranda Murguira (14 May 1915 – 22 March 2007) was a Peruvian cyclist. He competed in the individual and team road race events at the 1936 Summer Olympics.

References

External links
 

1915 births
2007 deaths
Peruvian male cyclists
Olympic cyclists of Peru
Cyclists at the 1936 Summer Olympics
Sportspeople from Lima
20th-century Peruvian people